The Little Sandy River is a tributary, roughly  long, of the Bull Run River in the U.S. state of Oregon. Forming west of Mount Hood in the Mount Hood National Forest, it flows generally west, roughly parallel to the Sandy River to the south. Its entire course lies in Clackamas County, and most of its main stem and tributaries are within the Bull Run Watershed Management Unit (BRWMU), a restricted zone that protects Portland's main water supply.

In 2008, Portland General Electric (PGE) removed the Little Sandy Dam, the only dam on the river, while decommissioning its Bull Run Hydroelectric Project. This made possible, for the first time in nearly a century, the return of migratory salmon and steelhead to the river. In 2009, both types of fish were reported spawning above the former dam site.

Course
Arising southeast of Hickman Butte in the Mount Hood National Forest, the river flows northwest between North Mountain on the left and Goodfellow Lakes on the right. Turning west, it passes south of Aschoff Buttes before receiving its only named tributaries, Bow Creek and Arrow Creek, both from the right. As the river nears a United States Geological Survey (USGS) stream gauge at river mile (RM) 1.95 or river kilometer (RK) 3.14, a ridge, the Devil's Backbone, separates the Little Sandy from the Sandy River to the south. Just below the stream gauge, the Little Sandy passes the former Little Sandy Dam.

Most of the course of the river lies within the BRWMU, a federally protected area of  surrounding the main drinking water supply for Portland.  Access to the BRWMU is generally limited to government employees and guests on official business, and security guards keep watch on its three gated entrances. In 1996, the U.S. Congress banned commercial logging on all federal lands in the Bull Run River watershed and, through the Little Sandy Act of 2001, extended the ban to include all federal lands draining into the Little Sandy River and the lower Bull Run River.

Discharge
The USGS monitors the flow of the Little Sandy River at a stream gauge  from the mouth of the river.

Little Sandy Dam

From 1912 through 2008, the river's flow was altered by the Bull Run Hydroelectric Project, which diverted water from the Sandy River at the Marmot Dam to the Little Sandy River at the Little Sandy Dam. Water was then diverted from the Little Sandy River to Roslyn Lake through a wood box flume. The artificial lake supplied the 22-megawatt Bull Run hydroelectric powerhouse and emptied into the Bull Run River.

The decommissioning restored the Little Sandy River to steelhead and salmon runs for the first time in nearly a century. PGE, the dams' owner, donated  of land near the dams to the Western Rivers Conservancy for a nature reserve and recreation area. In May 2009, a fish biologist reported that salmon and steelhead were spawning upstream of the former dam.

See also
List of rivers of Oregon

References

External links
Sandy River Basin Watershed Council

Rivers of Oregon
Rivers of Clackamas County, Oregon